163P/NEAT is a periodic comet discovered on November 5, 2004 by Near-Earth Asteroid Tracking (NEAT) using the 1.2 meter Samuel Oschin telescope at Palomar Observatory.

Precovery images of the comet were found by Maik Meyer in December 2004. There were two images from 1997, two images from 1991, and three images from 1990.

During the 2005 perihelion passage the comet brightened to an apparent magnitude of about 16.

References

External links 
 Orbital simulation from JPL (Java) / Horizons Ephemeris
 163P/NEAT – Seiichi Yoshida @ aerith.net
 Elements and Ephemeris for 163P/NEAT – Minor Planet Center
 163P/NEAT at the Minor Planet Center's Database
 163P/NEAT – Kazuo Kinoshita (2011 Oct. 6)

Periodic comets
0163

Comets in 2019
20041105